The Dickinson Press is a weekly newspaper printed in Dickinson, North Dakota.  The Press, as the paper is colloquially known, is the official newspaper of Stark County, North Dakota, and has a modest circulation in southwest North Dakota.  The paper is owned by Forum Communications.

References

External links
The Dickinson Press website

Newspapers published in North Dakota
Dickinson, North Dakota
Forum Communications Company